The Czech Republic has debuted in the Jeux sans frontières in 1993 after the dissolution of Czechoslovakia, who already participated. They won two International Finals and only lost one, against only to Hungary's Kecskemét in 1993.

Participation in the International Finals

References

Jeux sans frontières